Crowell is an unincorporated community in Dodge County, Nebraska, United States.

History
Crowell was laid out in 1883. It was either named for the proprietor of a local grain elevator or for Prince S. Crowell, a railroad official.

References

Unincorporated communities in Dodge County, Nebraska
Unincorporated communities in Nebraska